Clopton may refer to:

People
Clopton (name)

Places
Clopton, Cambridgeshire, a deserted medieval village
Clopton, Northamptonshire, a small village and civil parish
Clopton, Suffolk, a village
Clopton, Alabama
Clopton, Virginia (disambiguation), multiple locations
Clopton Bridge, Stratford-upon-Avon, England
Clopton House, near Stratford-upon-Avon, once owned by Hugh Clopton

See also
Clapton (disambiguation)